Cynthia Bailey Lee is a lecturer in Computer Science at Stanford University from Palo Alto, California. Her research interests are in computer science pedagogy and the flipped classroom approach. She has advocated for the greater inclusion of women and minorities in computer science, and is known for her "ladysplaining" article addressing the author of the controversial Google memo.

Education and work experience
Lee received her BS in 2001 and MS in 2004 in Computer Science from University of California, San Diego (UC San Diego). Lee studied big data applications of parallel computing and high-performance distributed computing for her graduate studies also at UC San Diego, where she graduated with her PhD in 2009. Her doctoral thesis evaluated scheduling algorithms for supercomputer systems. She spent her summers from 1996 to 1998 as an intern for NASA Ames, and worked with a search and document engine and management startup called Mohomine from 1999 to 2002. In March 2012, Lee and Beth Simon started an instructional website called Peer Instruction for Computer Science, which provides support for Computer Science instructors who want to use Flipped classroom ideas.

At Stanford University, Lee has taught numerous computer science courses, including Computer Organization and Systems, Programming Abstractions, Mathematical Foundations of Computing, and Race and Gender in Silicon Valley (a course she initiated in 2018).

Activism for women in tech
Lee is outspoken about issues that face women and minorities in technology. She wrote guidelines for other instructors in her department to help them foster a more inclusive community, including using gender-neutral language and examples. She encouraged instructors to give additional encouragement and attention to women and minorities. She is also for promoting conversations about faith, ethics, and tech culture.

Lee spoke at a Stanford LDS convocation, exhorting students to remember the needs of people outside of their work meetings, and used Esther as an example of someone who stood up for people who had less power than she did. She also hosted a coding workshop for young women and girls.

Awards
Lloyd W. Dinkelspiel Award (2019), Stanford University
Best Paper Award (2016), ACM SIGCSE
Professor of the Year (2015), Stanford Society of Women Engineers

References

American women computer scientists
American computer scientists
Stanford University faculty
Living people
University of California, San Diego alumni
Year of birth missing (living people)
Computer science educators
People from Palo Alto, California
Harold B. Lee Library-related 21st century articles
21st-century American women